Vanadis 4 Extra is a  chromium-molybdenum-vanadium alloyed tool steel produced by Uddeholms AB. It is intended for powder metallurgy cold forming operations on materials such as annealed austenitic stainless steel, mild carbon steel, copper and aluminium.

Chemical composition

Properties
Vanadis 4 Extra is characterized by high to very high:
ductility
abrasive-adhesive wear resistance
compressive strength
dimensional stability during heat treatment and in service
through-hardening properties
temper back resistance
machinability and grindability

Application areas
This tool steel is especially suitable for applications where adhesive wear and/or chipping are the dominating failure mechanisms, i.e.;

with soft/adherent materials such as austenitic stainless steel, mild steel, copper, aluminium, etc. as work material
with thicker work material
high strength work materials

Vanadis 4 Extra is however also very suitable for blanking and forming of Ultra High Strength Steel Sheet, these materials place high demands on the tool steel regarding abrasive wear resistance and ductility.

Examples:
Blanking and forming
Fine blanking
Cold extrusion tooling
Powder pressing
Deep drawing
Knives
Substrate steel for surface coating

References

Steels